Joule was an electric five seat passenger car by Optimal Energy, a South African company based in Cape Town. According to the company, it was to have a nominal driving range of 150 km and a top speed of 135 km/h. Designed to achieve a Euro NCAP 4 star safety rating, it complied with the stringent EU standards. It was a concept car that was never released commercially; development ceased in April 2012, and in June 2012 Optimal Energy announced its intention to close down.

Unveiling 
The Joule was first unveiled to the general public at the 2008 Paris Motor Show on October 2, 2008. It underwent some interior and exterior changes, most notably the change from a six-seater to a 5-seater vehicle, before being revealed to the public at the 2010 Geneva Motor show on 2 March 2010 in a form that was close to the final version.

Optimal Energy 
The Joule was the first electric car to be produced by Optimal Energy, the Cape Town based company has been working on the concept since 2004. The design of the car was done by Jaguar car designer Keith Helfet, who is best known for the XJ220, and the F-type concept car. The Joule showed the same 'flowing lines' as his previous designs.

Kobus Meiring, Optimal Energy CEO, suggested that sustainability of the Internal Combustion Engine vehicle has fuelled the increasing need for sustainable vehicle propulsion systems. This, as well as increasing fuel prices and rising country taxes, caused Optimal Energy to embark on the production of a vehicle that could meet these needs.

Investment to date 
Funding was primarily through government investments, in particular, the South African Department of Science & Technology (DST) through the Innovation Fund, as well as other private investments. The Innovation Fund invested about US$5 million in the project. The Industrial Development Corporation (IDC) of South Africa is a major shareholder, with 22% of equity in Optimal Energy.

Class 
The Joule was classed as a five-seat passenger car.

Specifications 
Length - 
Turning Circle - 
Mass - 
Seats - Five
Boot space - 
Top Speed - Governed at 
Acceleration - 0–60 km/h in less than 5 sec
Range - 
Charge time - The battery has a nominal recharge time of 10–12 hours

Closure 
A small pilot fleet of Joules was manufactured in conjunction with Hi-Tech Automotive in Port Elizabeth during 2010. The car was expected to be sold in South Africa as well as Europe from 2014, but production ceased in April 2012 after Optimal Energy failed to find a commercial partner. Optimal Energy announced its intention to close down in June 2012.

It was widely reported in the media that the company was bleeding cash, the production date had been pushed back four times, and the proposed sales figures were unrealistic. Optimal Energy required more than R2bn to bring the model to production, by which time it would have been obsolete. With the private sector unwilling to invest, the government declined to commit more taxpayers' money to an enterprise which was not commercially viable.

See also 

 Zero-emissions vehicle
 Electric car

References 

Electric concept cars
Cars of South Africa

de:Optimal Energy#Optimal Energy Joule